Vallens IF is a Swedish football club located in Stora Höga.

Background
Vallens IF men's team currently plays in Division 4 Bohuslän/Dalsland which is the sixth tier of Swedish football. The women's team is currently playing in Division 2. They play their home matches at the Stora Höga IP in Stora Höga, Stenungsund Municipality.

The club is affiliated to Bohusläns Fotbollförbund. Vallens IF have competed in the Svenska Cupen on 3 occasions and have played 5 matches in the competition.

Season to season

Footnotes

External links
 Vallens IF – Official website
 Vallens IF on Facebook

Football clubs in Västra Götaland County
Association football clubs established in 1958
1958 establishments in Sweden